Pass-to-Userspace Framework File System (puffs) is a NetBSD kernel subsystem developed for running filesystems in userspace.  It was added to NetBSD in the 5.0 release, and was ported to DragonFly BSD in the 3.2 release.

Filesystem in Userspace compatibility 
In NetBSD 5.0, puffs includes refuse, a reimplementation of the libfuse high-level interface. Some filesystems use the low-level libfuse interface or the kernel FUSE interface and they cannot be supported through refuse.

NetBSD 6.0 addresses that limitation through perfuse, a new compatibility layer that emulates the FUSE kernel interface.

See also

Filesystem in Userspace

References

External links
 Send and Receive of File System Protocols: Userspace Approach With puffs presented at AsiaBSDCon 2008.
 puffs - Pass-to-Userspace Framework File System presented at AsiaBSDCon 2007.
 ReFUSE: Userspace FUSE Reimplementation Using puffs presented at EuroBSDCon 2007.

NetBSD